Achras is a monotypic genus of Australasian beetles in the tribe Metriorrhynchini, erected by Charles Owen Waterhouse in 1879.  It contains the species Achras limbatum (Waterhouse, 1877).

References

External links
 

Lycidae
Beetle genera